Cilla Naumann (born 16 July 1960) is a Swedish author and journalist. Her first book, Vattenhjärta, came out in 1995. It won the Katapulpriset for "Best debut of the Year". Her next book was Dom, published in 2000.

Bibliography
1995 – Vattenhjärta
1996 – Väntan tillbaka
1998 – Vågorna Alma, vågorna
2000 – Dom
2002– Dem oss skyldiga äro
2004 – Fly
2006 – Värsta brorsan 
2007 – Vad ser du nu
2009 – I cirklarna runt
2009 – Kulor i hjärtat 
2011 – 62 dagar 
2011 – Lära sig 
2012 – Springa med åror
2013 – 17 timmar härifrån 
2015 – Bära barnet hem

References

Living people
1960 births
20th-century Swedish writers
21st-century Swedish writers
20th-century Swedish women writers
21st-century Swedish women writers